Beginning in July 1529, Philipp Melanchthon, along with Martin Luther and probably Justus Jonas, wrote the Articles of Schwabach (so named because they were presented at the Convention of Schwabach on 16 October of the same year), as a confession of faith with other Wittenberg theologians. Material from this document was later incorporated into the Augsburg Confession written by Philipp Melanchthon in 1530.

References

1529 works
16th-century Christian texts
Works by Martin Luther